Thomas Wells Thompson (born November 25, 1983 in Winston-Salem, North Carolina) is a retired American soccer player who last played as a midfielder for Carolina RailHawks in the North American Soccer League (NASL).

Career

High school and College
Thompson attended R.J. Reynolds High School, Forsyth Country Day School (aka, FCDS), and the Family Foundation School. He earned an All-North Carolina first team selection as a junior and senior as well as an all-conference and all-region selection.  After graduating from FCDS, he attended Wake Forest University where he played college soccer for four years. During his college years Thompson also played with Carolina Dynamo in the USL Premier Development League.

Professional

New England Revolution
Thompson was drafted in the first round (fifth overall) in the 2007 MLS SuperDraft by New England Revolution. In three seasons with the club the versatile midfielder appeared in 71 league matches scoring 2 goals. He also helped the club capture the 2007 Lamar Hunt U.S. Open Cup.

Colorado Rapids
He was traded to Colorado Rapids on January 21, 2010 as part of deal involving four players, MLS SuperDraft picks and allocation money. On April 14, 2010 Thompson scored his first two goals for Colorado in a 2-1 victory over Kansas City Wizards in a 2010 Lamar Hunt U.S. Open Cup qualification match.

Chicago Fire
He was traded to the Chicago Fire after asking for a trade. Thompson made 4 appearances for the Fire in the 2012 campaign, and has played in 5 games thus far in 2013 earning his first start on March 24, 2013. Thompson's aggressive on-field play has earned him the nickname "El Diablo". At the end of 2013 season the club did not renew Thompson's contract.

Charlotte Eagles
Thompson signed with USL Pro club Charlotte Eagles on March 3, 2014.

Carolina RailHawks
After Charlotte Eagle's move down to the USL PDL, Thompson signed with Carolina RailHawks on February 3, 2015.

Honors

New England Revolution
Lamar Hunt U.S. Open Cup (1): 2007
Major League Soccer Eastern Conference Championship (1): 2007
North American SuperLiga (1): 2008

Colorado Rapids
Major League Soccer Eastern Conference Championship (1): 2010
Major League Soccer MLS Cup (1): 2010

References

External links
 
 "With Wells Thompson" blog
 "Wells Thompson Interview" interview

1983 births
Living people
American soccer players
Wake Forest Demon Deacons men's soccer players
North Carolina Fusion U23 players
New England Revolution players
Colorado Rapids players
Chicago Fire FC players
Charlotte Eagles players
North Carolina FC players
Soccer players from North Carolina
New England Revolution draft picks
USL League Two players
Major League Soccer players
USL Championship players
Association football midfielders